Ferk Relief Foundationor FRF, is a non-profit organisation, legally registered and based in Ghana. The aim of the Ferk Relief Foundation is to alleviate poverty through activities that promote capacity building and self-reliance. The Ferk Relief Foundation believes that poverty alleviation is process-oriented, and it requires extensive community participation and relies on network to share resources, knowledge and expertise. This non profit organization, through fund raising and philanthropic support, is taking effective steps in Ghana to effect change in remote areas of the Sunyani Municipality.

Introduction
Ferk Relief Foundation was established by Victor Ferkah when he graduated from the university in Ghana. He has been working with the University of Energy and Natural Resources  for a while. In 2018, he formally registered the non profit organization with the name of Ferk Relief Foundation.

Mission
Ferk Relief Foundation is a nonprofit organization, whose main objectives are as follows:

Women Empowerment
Health Education
Skills Development
Women and Societal Capacity Building

Funding 

Ferk Relief Foundation is funded through donations from individuals and foundations.

References

External links 
 

Poverty-related organizations
Non-profit organisations based in Ghana
Organizations established in 2018